The 2006 Ironman World Championship was a long distance triathlon competition that was held on October 21, 2006 in Kailua-Kona, Hawaii. It was the 30th edition of the Ironman World Championship, which has been held annually in Hawaii since 1978. The championship was organized by the World Triathlon Corporation (WTC).

Championship results

Men

Women

References

External links
Ironman website

Ironman World Championship
Ironman
Ironman
Sports competitions in Hawaii
Triathlon competitions in the United States